Kreta Ayer–Tanglin Group Representation Constituency was a former four-member Group Representation Constituency (GRC) in southwestern Singapore.

History 
The GRC was formed in 1997 by splitting up Kampong Glam GRC and incorporating Kreta Ayer Single Member Constituency (SMC) and Tanglin SMC. The Cairnhill ward from Kampong Glam GRC was merged was Tanglin SMC to form the Tanglin ward.

During the 1997 Singaporean general election, a People's Action Party team led by Richard Hu and Lew Syn Pau contested the GRC and was uncontested.

The GRC existed for one electoral term as it was dissolved in 2001, splitting into Jalan Besar GRC and Tanjong Pagar GRC.

Members of Parliament

Electoral results

References

Singaporean electoral divisions
Orchard Road